David Richard Jones (October 24, 1832 – February 16, 1915) was a Welsh-American architect and poet.

Early life 
Jones was born October 24, 1832 in Dolwyddelan, North Wales, the son of Richard James Jones and Ann Jones. On September 2, 1845 Richard, Ann and family (5 boys and one girl) immigrated to the United States. Richard purchased 480 acres of government land east of the village of Cambria, Wisconsin. He built a log house and moved there in the spring of 1846. The farm was named Oakland.  In May 1852, David R. left Oakland for the city of Racine, Wisconsin where he apprenticed with architect Lucas Bradley. His brother, Evan O. Jones, remained in Cambria and was a member of the Wisconsin State Assembly and Senate.

Architecture 
Jones worked in Racine for about 4 years before he returned to Cambria. While in Cambria he designed and built many buildings in the area, along with maintaining a lumber yard. In 1871 he left Cambria to become the head draftsman for architect Abraham Radcliffe of St. Paul, Minnesota. In the spring of 1873, Jones returned to Wisconsin and started his own practice in Madison. He set up office on Main Street across from the Capitol.  He maintained the office in Madison until 1885.

In 1880 and 1881 Jones had a branch office in Racine Wisconsin. His head draftsman James Gilbert Chandler worked for him in the Racine office and later took over the business in 1882.

One of his first commissions in Madison was a mansion for General David Atwood, the founder and publisher of the Wisconsin State Journal.  Atwood wrote highly of Jones skill in his paper. Residences for other prominent Madisonians were soon to follow, Mayor Silas U. Pinney, Colonel C.G. Thorton, banker Lucien Hanks, and Judge Romanzo Bunn among others.

Madison was becoming a resort city in the 1870s and 80s. Two of Jones commissions were in response to that. Jones designed the buildings for the Monona Lake Assembly Chautauqua and the Tonyawatha Resort Hotel during that time period. Much of his other work was for the Wisconsin State Government. He designed buildings for the Normal Schools at Whitewater, Platteville and River Falls. He also designed buildings at the Mendota Insane Asylum, University of Wisconsin Madison and the north and south wings of the Wisconsin Capitol Building.

Jones had several students and employees within his firm. His students were Herman Esser, Owen J. Williams, and James G. Chandler. He employed Edward Stark, Frederick W. Paunach, William Kleinpell and J. Albert Swenon.

The capitol disaster 
In the spring of 1882, the Wisconsin State Legislature approved $200,000 for the extension of the Wisconsin State Capitol. An architectural competition was held and Jones was awarded the commission. In May of that year bids were sought, with a project completion date of January 1, 1884. Twice the project went out for bids only to exceed the $200,000 approved by the state legislature. Twice Jones was requested to revise the plans in order to bring down the bids. One of the revisions eliminated the octagonal towers and the lower ranks of iron columns were replaced with stone piers. Eventually the firm of Bentley and Nowlan were the successful bidders with a bid of $188,370.  By late 1883 the north wing was all but completed. The south wing had some additional work to be structurally complete. On November 8th, at 1:40 pm the south wing collapsed, trapping and killing 8 workmen and injuring many others. Immediately after, Governor Jeremiah Rusk called together a group of specialist to determine the cause. The group was made up of Albert C. Nash, a prominent architect from Ohio, Godfrey Ludwig, the superintendent of public buildings for Cincinnati Ohio, Carl F. Struck architect from Minneapolis, and J.R. Willett an architect from Chicago. Their report placed the blame on substandard materials, specifically the cast iron columns.  The day after the disaster, a coroner’s inquest was impaneled. That inquest was led by Dane County District Attorney Robert M. La Follette.  "The panel found Nowlan culpable of "improperly and insufficiently" repairing a fault in the second-story pier near the southeast corner of the extension, which they found to have contributed to the falling of the south wing. They also found D. R. Jones and a consulting Milwaukee architect, Henry C. Koch, guilty of negligence "in designing the internal construction of the said south wing of the Capitol Extension without a due and proper regard for the safety during the erection . . ."

The aftermath of  the capitol disaster 
After the collapse of the capitol, both the number and the scale of the projects declined for Jones. In 1885 Jones sold his Madison office to Owen J. Williams. Jones returned to Cambria where he continued to design buildings until just prior to his death. His post Madison works include buildings for the City of Portage Wisconsin (Fire Engine House and Council Room), Columbia County (Register of Deeds Building, Jail and Sheriffs House, Insane Asylum, Poor House), the State of Wisconsin and numerous churches and residences throughout south central Wisconsin.

In 1893, Jones was hired by William H. Jones, President of the Plano Manufacturing Company, as the principal and supervising architect for the construction of a new manufacturing plant.  When completed, the factory encompassed 25 acres of land in West Pullman, Illinois and employed 1400 workers.  Jones worked on the project from 1893 to 1905.  In 1902 the Plano Manufacturing Company merged with the McCormick Harvesting Machine Company, the Deering Harvester Company, and 2 other companies to form the International Harvester Company.

Jones' last known building, the addition to the Cambria Wisconsin High School, was in 1911.

Selected works 

General David Atwood House, Madison, Wisconsin
Washburn Observatory 1401 Observatory Dr, Madison, Wisconsin
Monona Lake Assembly 1155 E Lakeside St, Madison, Wisconsin
Judge Romanzo Bunn House, 104 Langdon St, Madison, Wisconsin
Assembly Hall (Music Hall), 925 Bascom Mall University of Wisconsin Madison, Wisconsin

Smith and Lamb Business Block, 105 W. Main St, Madison, Wisconsin
First Congregational Church, 103 S. Church St, Whitewater, Wisconsin

M.J. Rowland House, 124 W. Florence St, Cambria, Wisconsin
George Q. Erskine House, 920 Main St, Racine, Wisconsin
Wisconsin Building, U.S. Centennial Exhibition, Philadelphia, Pennsylvania
Wisconsin State Capitol Extension (3rd Capitol), Madison, Wisconsin
Magnetic Observatory, University of Wisconsin, Madison, Wisconsin
Plano Manufacturing Company, West Pullman, Illinois
Tonyawatha Spring Hotel, Madison, Wisconsin
State Normal School, River Falls, Wisconsin
H.T. Bailey Store and Opera House, 194 E Court St, Richland Center, Wisconsin
Warren House Hotel, Baraboo, Wisconsin
Engine House #3, 700 6th St, Racine, Wisconsin
Wisconsin State Hospital for the Insane, Madison, Wisconsin
Rountree Hall Addition, 30 N. Elm St., Platteville, Wisconsin
Grace Episcopal Church (Rem), 116 W. Washington Avenue, Madison Wisconsin

Poetry 
Jones was considered a fine poet among many Welsh Americans, but because of the influence of Charles Darwin on his poetry, others found it unacceptable.  He wrote poetry for the newspaper ‘Y Drych’ and for local publications such as the Cambria News.  Jones and his poetry were featured in the Cambrian, a magazine published in Utica New York.  Jones had two books of poetry published, “Hans Bywrd yr Han Lywyd” (1897) and “Yr Ymchwilan y Galwuni” (1910).  His unpublished works are in a collection at Bangor University in Wales UK.

Personal life 
On October 30, 1857, Jones married Jane Williams of Welsh Prairie, Wisconsin. Four children were born from this union, (Mary, Margaret, Richard and Jane). Richard died in 1865, a year after his birth from scarlet fever.  Though Richard’s death was painful for the entire family, it was especially difficult for David to lose his son.  Six years later, his wife, Jane, died in 1871 while the family was living in St. Paul, Minnesota. He was left with his three daughters to mourn her loss.  Jones moved back to Wisconsin in 1873.  It was there that he met the woman that was to be his new bride.  On December 24, 1878 he was married to Annie Roberts of Sun Prairie, Wisconsin.  She remained by his side until his death in 1915.

Death
David Richard Jones died February 16, 1915, at the age of 82 and is buried in the Cambria Cemetery along with his wives.

References

1832 births
1915 deaths
Welsh emigrants to the United States
People from Conwy County Borough
People from Madison, Wisconsin
Architects from Wisconsin
Poets from Wisconsin
People from Cambria, Wisconsin
People from Racine, Wisconsin